Kumarapuram massacre also known as 1996 Trincomalee massacre or 1996 Killiveddy massacre refers to the murder of 24 minority Sri Lankan Tamil civilians, allegedly by the Sri Lankan security forces on February 11, 1996. The victims included 13 women and 9 children below the age of 12. Further 28 civilians were severely injured as well. The event took place in a village called Kumarapuram, located in the eastern district of Trincomalee. It was a notable  mass murder of civilians since the resumption of armed conflict between rebel forces and Sri Lankan armed forces since April 1995, as part of the Sri Lankan civil war.  The then-government arrested a number of soldiers and home guards who allegedly carried out the massacre. A court case was started on 2004. On 27 July 2016 the court acquitted six former army Corporals who were accused over the massacre, after they were found not guilty.

Background information

During the British colonial period, approximately 60% civil service jobs were held by the minority Sri Lankan Tamils. They constituted approximately 15% of the population prior to 1948. This was due to the availability of Western style education as provided by the Protestant American missionaries, Hindu revivalists and local Catholic mission in the Tamil dominant Jaffna peninsula. After gaining independence from Britain in 1948, Sinhalese politicians made the apparent over representation a political issue. They initiated measures aimed at correcting the over representation by establishing ethnic quotas for University entrants.  These measures, and a series of riots and pogroms starting from 1958 that targeted Sri Lankan Tamils and the resultant mass murder, displacements and refugees, led to the formation of  rebel groups advocating independence for Sri Lankan Tamils. After the 1983 Black July pogrom, full scale civil war erupted between the government and the rebel groups. During the course of the civil war there were number of massacres of civilians, war rapes, torture and enforced disappearances attributed to both the government and allied groups as well as the various rebel formations.

The Massacre
It took place at Kumarapuram, Trincomalee district, on February 11, 1996. According to several survivors interviewed by Amnesty International, 24 civilians, including 13 women and seven children below the age of 12, were killed by soldiers from the 58th mile post and Dehiwatte army camps, accompanied by Home Guards from Dehiwatte. Home guards are local civilians drafted as para-military by the government of Sri Lanka.

The killings were in apparent reprisal for the killings by the rebel Liberation Tigers of Tamil Eelam (LTTE) of two soldiers near a location called the 58th mile post on February 11, 1996 about half an hour earlier. According to one witness, a group of soldiers, some of whom were drunk, gathered at Dehiwatte junction and then proceeded towards Kumarapuram, shouting "death to the Tamils". The villagers of Kumarapuram had taken refuge inside their houses. The soldiers broke open the shutters and aimed their guns at the people hiding inside. One woman recounted how she pleaded with them not to shoot but to no avail. In her house, seven people were killed, including a six-year-old child.

Rapes and murder
Among the victims was 17-year-old Arumaithurai Tharmaletchumi. She was dragged from a boutique in the village and taken to the milk collection centre where she was raped before being shot. Antony Joseph, a 14-year-old boy, who tried to stop the soldiers from dragging her away, was shot between his legs. There were reports of one more rape and murder as well. In total two girls were raped and murdered as part of the massacre.

Government Investigation
The trial of the Kumarapuram massacre has been pending at the Trincomalee High Court. All the accused have been released on bail while one of the accused soldiers died. All material evidence, including weapons allegedly used in the killing of Tamil civilians in the Kumarapuram massacre, were destroyed when the office of the Government Analyst in Colombo was gutted by fire in 2004.

Notes
According to University Teachers for Human Rights (UTHR), there was another notable massacre in the same vicinity in 1985 and it is known as the Killiveddy massacre. Sometimes the Kumamarapuram massacre of 1996 is also referred to as Killiveddy massacre.

References

External links
UTHR Bulletin #10, details about the background and massacres in the region
AI report on Sri Lanka 1997
Land grievances in the massacre area

1996 crimes in Sri Lanka
February 1996 crimes
February 1996 events in Asia
Massacres in 1996
Attacks on civilians attributed to the Sri Lanka Army
Massacres in Sri Lanka
Mass murder in 1996
Mass murder of Sri Lankan Tamils
Sri Lankan government forces attacks in Eelam War III
Terrorist incidents in Sri Lanka in 1996